was a Japanese experimental sampling unit created by Susumu Hirasawa. The group was active from 1983 to 1987, although it was never officially ended, and was revived by Hirasawa in 1994 to 1996.

History
In 1983, Susumu Hirasawa's band P-Model had their Another Game album delayed four months by their label Tokuma Japan Communications, who demanded the group redo the lyrics of the song "Atom-Siberia", claiming they encouraged discrimination. After this, P-Model broke their contract with Tokuma and created the "Another Act" project, where the group would release records with compositions made independently by each member in styles different from P-Model. Hirasawa's releases were made under the name Shun, experimental in nature and featuring heavier use of Hirasawa's homemade sampler, the Heavenizer.

After the fourth Shun album in 1987, the project was put into dormancy until 1994, when Hirasawa re-branded it as Syun, a label to release some of his less commercial works. The same year Syun released Landscapes, an ambient album featuring sounds created by the Vista landscape design software for the Amiga. In 1996, Syun released the Thai-inspired Kun Mae on a Calculation. No more albums were released under the Shun/Syun name after 1996, although Hirasawa continued to use the sounds that originated in Syun albums, most notably in his soundtracks for the adaptations of Berserk and the works of Satoshi Kon.

Discography

Members
Susumu Hirasawa – All releases
Akiro "Kamio" Arishima – shun and Landscapes
Akemi Tsujitani – shun
Iwao Asama – shun
Yuji Matsuda – SHUN 2nd, SHUN IIIrd SHEETS and SHUN・4
Teruo Nakano – SHUN 2nd
Hiromi Seki – SHUN・4
Shuichi Sugawara – SHUN・4
Shigeo Motojima – SHUN・4
The oldman, who was on the way to IWATE. – SHUN・4
Motohiro Yamada – Landscapes
Sacol Trakranprasirt – Kun Mae on a Calculation
Supat Kuntatun – Kun Mae on a Calculation
Yūichi Hirasawa – SHUN・4 VISION (except SHUN・II)
Hiroshi Moriguchi – SHUN・4 VISION (SHUN・II only)
Kiyoshi Inagaki – SHUN・4 VISION ("GRAPHIX")

External links
SHUN/SYUN Discography at NO ROOM – The official site of Susumu Hirasawa (P-MODEL)
Shun at Discogs
Shun at Rate Your Music
旬 at MusicBrainz
Japanese Hirasawa fansite (lists Shun/Syun releases and advertisements)
Japanese Hirasawa encyclopedia (list relationships between songs of the Shun/Syun albums and other Hirasawa songs)
Hirasawa fansite in English (talks a bit about Shun/Syun)

Japanese experimental musical groups
Japanese electronic musicians
Japanese new wave musical groups
Japanese rock music groups
DIW Records artists
Musical groups established in 1984
Musical groups disestablished in 1996